Gliese 649 b , or Gl 649 b is an extrasolar planet, orbiting the 10th magnitude M-type star Gliese 649, 10 parsecs from earth. This planet is a sub-Jupiter, massing 0.328 Jupiter mass and orbits at 1.135 AU.

References

Exoplanets discovered in 2009
Exoplanets detected by radial velocity
Giant planets
Hercules (constellation)
6